Orillia/Lake St John (Orillia Rama Regional) Water Aerodrome  is located  northeast of Orillia, Ontario, Canada.

The airport is classified as an airport of entry by Nav Canada and is staffed by the Canada Border Services Agency (CBSA). CBSA officers at this airport can handle general aviation aircraft only, with no more than 15 passengers.

See also
 Orillia Airport
 Orillia/Matchedash Lake Water Aerodrome

References

Registered aerodromes in Ontario
Transport in Orillia
Seaplane bases in Ontario